Once Films is a St. Louis, Missouri based commercial video production company that creates documentary-style short films, brand films and commercial video content. They are noted for the Emmy and Addy award winning short documentary film series The Spotlight Series. Spotlight is a collection of personal storytelling vignettes featuring craftsmen, artists, and entrepreneurs. Each story is a behind the scenes look at what it means to love what you do and do what you love.

Background

Founding and business model (2010-2011) 
Once Films was founded in 2010 and went live with its first video project, a brand story for SPACE Architects, on December 22, 2010. 
Once Films worked to fill the need for corporate, non-profit and advertising brand films in a rich, documentary film style.  
A small group of filmmakers with different talents, Once Films states that its mission is to “do projects we believe in” and be “fulfilled by helping those organizations we love find success.” The founders selected the name Once Films as a nod to “Once Upon a Time,” a subtle reminder that “all great stories begin with Once.”

Early growth (2012-2015) 
In early 2013, the company launched the documentary short “Bob the Baker,” the first film in what would become the company's. Once Films would go on to produce 5 more films in the series in 2014 while growing its rolodex of clients and hiring several full-time staffers. By the end of 2015, Once Films had completed nearly 200 films for projects in the St. Louis area and across the country.

Recent developments (2016-present) 
In June 2016, Once Films moved its offices to the city of St. Louis, setting up shop in the MidTown Alley Design District neighborhood. Once Films had won a variety of local and national industry awards over the years, including a National American Advertising Award for Cinematography, an International CLIO Award for Advertising in Healthcare, 9 Mid-America Emmy Award wins in just 5 appearances.

Filmography 
 SPACE Architects - 2011
 The St. Louis Public Library - 2013
 The Farm at St. Joe’s - 2013
 Tarlton - 2014
 The Lamborghini Huracan - 2014
 American Graduate Maxine Clark - 2015
 The Forest Park Forever Campaign - 2015
 The United Way of Greater St. Louis Campaign - 2015
 Porsche St. Louis - 2016
 The Respite Care Program - 2016
 Robust - 2016
 The University of the Ozarks - 2016
 LHM Three-Sixty Lounge STL - 2016
 Pulitzer Arts Foundation: Medardo Rosso - 2016
 Redefining Normal: Reclaim Renew - 2017
 The United Way of Greater St. Louis 2017 Campaign - 2017
 My Town - 2017
 What Is Modern Ag? - 2017
 Mercy Mondays at the Ballpark - 2017
 The Avera LIGHT Program - 2017

The Spotlight Series filmography 
 Bob the Baker - 2013  
 Signs - 2014   
 SUMP - 2014  
 Tattoo - 2014   
 Stone - 2014    
 Mwanzi - 2014   
 Arc - 2015   
 The Timekeeper - 2015   
 The Alchemy of Color - 2017    
 Barrel - 2017

Awards and nominations

2017 
 Mid-America NATAS Emmy Award - Director - Post Production
 Mid-America NATAS Emmy Award - Interstitial
 Mid-America NATAS Emmy Nomination - Photographer - Program
 Mid-America NATAS Emmy Nomination - Photographer - Program
 Mid-America NATAS Emmy Nomination - Short Format - Program
 22nd AIGA STL Design Show - Video (2 Awards)
 American Advertising Award (ADDY), District 9 Silver - Cinematography
 American Advertising Award (ADDY), Saint Louis Regional Gold - Cinematography
 American Advertising Award (ADDY), Saint Louis Regional Silver - Internet Commercial
 Catholic Press Association Award, 2nd – Story & Photo Package
 Telly Awards Silver - Craft: Cinematography
 Telly Awards Bronze (4 Awards) - Categories: Health & Wellness, Hospital, Food & Beverage, Fund Raising

2016 
 Mid-America NATAS Emmy Award - Community/Public Service - Campaign
 Mid-America NATAS Emmy Award - Director - Post Production
 Mid-America NATAS Emmy Award - Photographer - Program
 Mid-America NATAS Emmy Award - Interstitial
 Mid-America NATAS Emmy Nomination - Program Promo - Campaign (Non News)
 Communication Arts Award of Excellence, Photography Annual 57
 American Advertising Award (National ADDY) – Cinematography
 American Advertising Award (ADDY), District 9 Gold - Cinematography
 American Advertising Award, Saint Louis Regional "Best of" - Cinematography
 American Advertising Award, Saint Louis Regional Gold - Cinematography
 American Advertising Award, Saint Louis Regional Silver - Television: Local Campaign

2015 
 Mid-America NATAS Emmy Award – Human Interest, Program Feature Segment
 Mid-America NATAS Emmy Award – Interstitial
 Mid-America NATAS Emmy Nomination – Arts & Entertainment, Program Feature Segment
 American Advertising Award (ADDY), District 9 Gold – Single Medium Campaign
 American Advertising Award (ADDY), District 9 Gold – Cinematography
 Communicator Awards - Award of Excellence - Online Video, Web Series
 Communicator Awards - Award of Excellence - Film/Video
 American Advertising Award, Saint Louis Regional, Judges Citation – Cinematography
 American Advertising Award, Saint Louis Regional Gold – Cinematography
 American Advertising Award, Saint Louis Regional Gold – Single Medium Campaign
 American Advertising Award, Saint Louis Regional Silver – Cinematography
 Catholic Press Association Award, 3rd – Best Multiple Picture Package

2014 
 Mid-America NATAS Emmy Award – Interstitial
 (3) Mid-America NATAS Emmy Nominations
 American Advertising Award (National ADDY) – Cinematography
 Communication Arts Award of Excellence,
 Design Annual 55 – Self Promotion Series
 American Advertising Award (ADDY), District 9 Gold – Cinematography
 American Advertising Award, Saint Louis Regional Gold – Cinematography
 American Advertising Award, Saint Louis Regional Silver – Branded Content
 Best of NAMA NATIONAL FINALIST – Audio/Visual
 Motorcycle Film Festival Official Selection
 Tattoo Arts Film Festival - Canada Official Selection

2013 and Earlier 
 2013 International CLIO Award for Advertising in Healthcare – Film
 2013 St. Louis International Film Festival Selection
 2013 (2 Awards) National Agri-Marketing Award – Region II First Place
 2013 TAM Award SILVER
 2011, 2012, 2013 ADDY Awards for Cinematography & Branded Content, more than 60 seconds
 2011 (3 Awards), 2012 (6 Awards) Telly Awards for branding, editing, and cinematography
 2012, 2013 BMA/Target Marketing Awards
 2011 AIGA Award – Professional Promotion

References

Links 
 Communication Arts Exhibit Online  
 St. Louis Business Journal 
 Jim Harper Creative 
 Sauce Magazine - Award 
 Feast Magazine - ADDY Awards for Bob the Baker  
 Enrich Blog 
 SPACE Architecture 
 American Advertising Federation - Cinematography  
 Communication Arts - Spotlight Series 
 St. Louis Egotist 
 St. Louis Egotist - Makers 
 St. Louis Egotist - STL Spotlight Series Sculptor 
 St. Louis Egotist - STL Spotlight Series - Tattoo 
 St. Louis Egotist - STL Spotlight Series Sump 
 St. Louis Egotist - STL Spotlight Series St. Louis Public Library 
 St. Louis Egotist - STL Spotlight Series Signpainter  
 St. Louis Egotist - ADDY Gold Winners List 2014 
 St. Louis Egotist - STL Spotlight Series Baker  
 St. Louis Egotist - STL Spotlight Series Timekeeper  
 St. Louis Egotist - STL Spotlight Series Mwanzi 
 STL Design Week 
 St. Louis Magazine - SUMP 
 Riverfront Times - STL Spotlight Series promotes small businesses  
 KTVI FOX 2 - Barrel Beard and Tattoo St. Louis Spotlight   
 HEC TV  
 ALIVE Magazine Well Crafted  
 2016 AAF District 9 ADDY Winners 
 St. Charles Community College - Chris Ryan Success Story 
 Stable 11 Design - STL Spotlight Series  
 The Normal Brand Midwest Mule 
 Bob Vila - STL Spotlight Mwanzi 
 Best of NAMA Awards 
 The Makers 
 Feast Magazine 
 Once Films Official website 
 Once Films on IMDbPro (subscription required)
 The Spotlight Series website

2010 establishments in Missouri
Video production companies